41st meridian may refer to:

41st meridian east, a line of longitude east of the Greenwich Meridian
41st meridian west, a line of longitude west of the Greenwich Meridian